Amphioctopus is a genus of octopuses comprising around 16 species.

Description 
Members of the genus Amphioctopus reside in tropical and subtropical waters.  These octopuses are found primarily in the Pacific and Indian Oceans but representatives can also be found in the Atlantic. They are characterized by arms that are about two or three times their mantle length with deep lateral webs and very shallow dorsal webs. This genus can be further divided into two subgroups, one group with ocellate octopuses, the other with non-ocellate octopuses.

Taxonomic status 
Historically, members of this genus were placed within the genus Octopus, but recognized as forming a distinct group and referred to as the Octopus aegina species complex. The genus was originally described by Fischer in 1882. He assigned to it the already described species, Octopus membranaceus (Quoy and Gaimard, 1832), as the type species (not to be confused with Enteroctopus membranaceus (Rochebrune and Mabille, 1889), the original types species of the genus Enteroctopus).  Robson in his review of octopus taxonomy in 1929 regarded Amphioctopus membranaceus as a nomen dubium, referring it to his newly named "aegina species complex", a group of octopuses forming a distinct constellation characterized by Octopus aegina.  The genus Amphioctopus was subsequently considered invalid.  In 2002, Gleadall suggested that the aegina species group represents a distinct genus with Amphioctopus being the senior name. In 2004, Gleadall resurrected the genus Schizoctopus and assigned Octopus fangsiao as the type species.  In 2005, Huffard and Hochberg, arguing that Robson's designation of Octopus membranaceus as a nomen dubium was premature and considering it a valid name, resurrected the genus name Amphioctopus for the Octopus aegina species complex.  Huffard and Hochberg also found Schizoctopus to be a junior synonym for Amphioctopus.

Species

Amphioctopus aegina
Amphioctopus arenicola
Amphioctopus burryi
Amphioctopus exannulatus
Amphioctopus fangsiao
Amphioctopus granulatus *
Amphioctopus kagoshimensis
Amphioctopus marginatus, veined octopus
Amphioctopus membranaceus *
Amphioctopus mototi
Amphioctopus neglectus
Amphioctopus polyzenia
Amphioctopus rex
Amphioctopus robsoni
Amphioctopus siamensis
Amphioctopus varunae

Species marked with an asterisk (*) remain unresolved.

References

Octopodidae